Tranos Choros is a form of a Greek folk dance from Kozani, Greece.

See also
Music of Greece
Greek dances

References
Vlaxoi.net - Τρανός xoρόs

Greek dances
Greek music